Jonathan "Jon" Shestack is a film producer.  He has produced well-known movies such as Air Force One. Additionally, he was one of the founders of Cure Autism Now, an autism organization that merged with Autism Speaks in 2006. His father is Jerome J. Shestack, a well-known lawyer from Philadelphia.

Shestack has stated that his production style involves starting with a pitch for a script. He then refines the idea as needed until a studio decides that it will be made into a movie.  He has also advocated giving credit to people that play an indirect role in moviemaking. He has been eager to use the films he produces to raise money for autism research.

Shestack started Cure Autism Now after his son, Dov, was diagnosed with autism. One of the organization's goals was to raise money for scientific research on autism. Shestack received many donations from connections in Hollywood. He was known for being able to attract significant donors and awareness, to the extent that he played a major role in convincing congress to pass the important Combating Autism Act of 2006. Initially, Shestack was against the merger of the organization with Autism Speaks, but decided to eventually accept the merger.

Shestack has stated that Ari Ne'eman, an autistic activist, did not want to understand the challenges of severe autism when he was being nominated to the National Council on Disability.

References

External links 

California Resolution Honoring Jonathan Shestack

American film producers
American television producers
Activists from California
1959 births
Living people